This is a list of the heritage sites in Colesberg as recognised by the South African Heritage Resource Agency.

|}

References 

Tourist attractions in the Northern Cape
Colesberg
Heritage sites